Henry Edward Chaney (5 August 1882 – 27 February 1919) was a British sports shooter. and inventor of the first practical gun camera

Sports Shooting 
He competed in the 300 metre free rifle event at the 1908 Summer Olympics. He ranked 40th.

RFC 
Henry joined the Lancashire fusiliers as a private soldier at 16 in 1898, he was promoted to sergeant in 1899, sergeant instructor in 1904, sergeant major instructor in 1907 and Quartermaster Sergeant instructor in 1909.

From this he became involved in arms development work , particularly with the Lewis gun. Chaney was also involved with the creation of the first "Gunbus". 

Over the years, Chaney had accumulated a good deal of experience with cameras and photographic equipment as well as of machine guns, and began to experiment with combining the two. His first successful gun camera consisted of a standard Lewis gun, to which a box camera had been bolted alongside the barrel. Further development led to the Hythe Gun Camera Mk 111 ,in which the camera body was incorporated into the barrel. The camera was cocked by using the Lewis gun’s cocking handle, and tripped the shutter through an internal linkage to the gun’s trigger. The gun camera now looked, balanced, and behaved much like a proper Lewis gun. Its design was approved and production authorized by the War Office.

He was awarded a 1918 New Year Honours (OBE) by King George V

Death 
Chaney was found dead in his rented flat at Baron’s Court, London, in 1919. It transpired that he had shot and wounded his mother, who was staying with him at the time, before turning the gun on himself and firing a single shot into his left temple. The coroner recorded a verdict of “Suicide during temporary insanity”.At the time of his death, Chaney was penning a book about his life as a flying officer during World War I and there were reports about him living with a younger woman at the Baron’s Court address, while his wife and seven children were living away in the country at Wokingham, near Reading.He is buried in North sheen cemetery

References

1882 births
1919 deaths
British male sport shooters
Olympic shooters of Great Britain
Shooters at the 1908 Summer Olympics
People from Bermondsey
Sportspeople from London

Royal Flying Corps
World War I